Vallner is an Estonian surname. Notable people with the surname include:

 Artur Vallner (1887–1939), Estonian educator and politician
 Karl Andre Vallner (born 1998), Estonian footballer
 Siiri Vallner (born 1972), Estonian architect

Estonian-language surnames